LinuxForums.org was an Internet forum for Linux users needing free help and support with their Linux distributions and software, and computer hardware. It was owned by MAS Media Inc. With more than 200,000 registered members, it was one of the most active Linux forums and free software community sites on the Internet.

Support was given in different ways in specific forums, such as on a distribution level (for major distribution such as Red Hat/Fedora Core, Ubuntu, Suse, Slackware, Debian, Gentoo, Arch), but also on an operational level (for areas such as Wireless, Applications, Servers, Networking, Desktop / X Window, Programming & Scripting).

In November 2008 the forum changed ownership and did a complete overhaul of the site.

Breach and shutdown
In May 2018, the Linux Forums website suffered a data breach which resulted in the disclosure of 276k unique email addresses.

Since May 2020, the website has been offline. No explanation has been provided.

References

Internet properties established in 2009
Internet properties disestablished in 2020
Defunct websites